Merthyr Plymouth Street railway station was a station that served the town of Merthyr Tydfil, Wales on the Taff Vale Railway. The station opened in 1841 as the original station until the completion of the nearby Merthyr High Street station was opened on the Vale of Neath Railway. The station at Plymouth Street closed in 1877 to passengers which were diverted to the High Street station. The viaduct was demolished and the site of Plymouth Street station is now occupied by Plymouth Court.

References 

Disused railway stations in Merthyr Tydfil County Borough
Former Taff Vale Railway stations
Railway stations in Great Britain opened in 1841
Railway stations in Great Britain closed in 1877
1881 establishments in Wales
1965 disestablishments in Wales